Bornstein is a German and Ashkenazi surname. It may refer to:

David Bornstein (author) (born ?), Canadian-born U.S. business writer and journalist
David Bornstein (politician) (born 1940), Australian politician
Ernst Israel Bornstein (1922 - 1978), Polish-born Jewish holocaust survivor, author of 'Die Lange Nacht'
Harold Bornstein, American gastroenterologist
Jonathan Bornstein (born 1984), American-Israeli soccer player
Kate Bornstein (born 1948), U.S. author, playwright, performance artist, and gender theorist
Marc H. Bornstein (born ?), U.S. biologist and psychologist
Murray Bornstein (1917–1995), U.S. neuroscientist, biologist, and educator
Sam Bornstein (1920-1990), British historian and activist
Steve Bornstein (born 1952), U.S. sports television executive
Stefan R. Bornstein (born 1961), German physician and University Professor
Thorsten Botz-Bornstein (born 1964), German philosopher

See also
Neudorf-Bornstein, German municipality
Landolt–Börnstein, online science and engineering database

de:Bornstein